William McDonald (9 July 1905 – 1979) was a Scottish footballer who played as an inside forward. Born in Coatbridge, Lanarkshire, he played for Law Scotia, Dundee United, Broxburn United, Albion Rovers, Armadale, Airdrieonians, Manchester United, Tranmere Rovers, Coventry City and Plymouth Argyle.

References

1905 births
Footballers from Coatbridge
Scottish footballers
Association football inside forwards
Scottish Football League players
English Football League players
Airdrieonians F.C. (1878) players
Dundee United F.C. players
Manchester United F.C. players
Tranmere Rovers F.C. players
Armadale F.C. players
Albion Rovers F.C. players
Albion Rovers F.C. wartime guest players 
East Fife F.C. wartime guest players
Plymouth Argyle F.C. players
Coventry City F.C. players
1979 deaths